João Pedro Maturano dos Santos (born 15 November 1996), known as João Pedro, is a Brazilian footballer who plays for Grêmio, as a right back.

Club career

Palmeiras
A Palmeiras youth graduate, João Pedro was born in Presidente Bernardes, São Paulo. In September 2014, aged just 17, he was called up to the first team by manager Dorival Júnior.

On 17 September 2014, João Pedro made his first team – and Série A – debut, starting in a 2–2 home draw against Flamengo. He scored his first goal on 11 October, netting the winner in a 2–1 home success over Grêmio, and finished the year as a starter as his side narrowly avoided relegation.

After the arrival of Lucas and João Paulo, João Pedro was only utilized as a backup during the 2015 campaign, but he did play in the second leg of the 2015 Copa do Brasil Finals against Santos (2–2, 4–3 win on penalties). The same occurred the following year, as he served as Jean's backup and lifted the Brasileirão trophy, but appearing rarely.

On 10 January 2017, João Pedro was officially presented at Chapecoense, after agreeing to a one-year loan deal with the club. He played 12 games as the team mourning the recent death of most of its players won the Campeonato Catarinense, scoring once in a 4–1 home win over Brusque on 29 March.

At the start of 2018, João Pedro was lent to Bahia for the whole of 2018. He played seven games as they too were crowned state champions.

Porto
On 7 June 2018, João Pedro signed for FC Porto on a five-year contract for a fee of €4 million. Used mainly for the reserve team in LigaPro, he played just three games in cups in his first season, starting with a 1–1 home draw with G.D. Chaves in the Taça da Liga group stage on 14 September.

On 30 July 2019, João Pedro returned to Bahia on loan until the end of 2020. He was part of the squad that won the 2020 Campeonato Baiano, but was unused in the final penalty shootout victory over Atlético Alagoinhas in the final on 8 August; he played 12 games in the Copa do Nordeste including both legs of the 4–1 aggregate final loss to Ceará.

Career statistics

Honours
Palmeiras
Campeonato Brasileiro Série A: 2016
Copa do Brasil: 2015

Chapecoense
Campeonato Catarinense: 2017

Bahia
Campeonato Baiano: 2018, 2020

References

External links

1996 births
Living people
Footballers from São Paulo (state)
Brazilian footballers
Association football defenders
Campeonato Brasileiro Série A players
Sociedade Esportiva Palmeiras players
Associação Chapecoense de Futebol players
Esporte Clube Bahia players
Sport Club Corinthians Paulista players
Grêmio Foot-Ball Porto Alegrense players
Liga Portugal 2 players
FC Porto players
FC Porto B players
2015 South American Youth Football Championship players
Brazil youth international footballers
Brazil under-20 international footballers
Brazilian expatriate footballers
Brazilian expatriate sportspeople in Portugal
Expatriate footballers in Portugal